James Robert Owen "Bob" Atcher (May 11, 1914 – October 31, 1993) was an American country musician.

Biography
Atcher was born in Hardin County, Kentucky, United States, and learned violin and guitar from his father, who was a champion fiddle player. He started out on radio in Louisville on WHAS, and was offered spots on a number of other stations in the American South and Midwest. In 1939, he was offered a regular gig on Chicago station WBBM which was broadcast nationally by CBS. The show made him a national star, and he signed with ARC just before CBS bought the company. After the purchase Atcher was transferred to Okeh Records and then to Columbia Records, both CBS subsidiaries.

Productive Years 
Between 1939 and 1942, he recorded many duets with Loeta Applegate, who went by the stage name "Bonnie Blue Eyes." Among these was the first No. 1 of Jimmie Davis' "You Are My Sunshine". He scored two solo hits with versions of "I'm Thinking Tonight of My Blue Eyes" and Ernest Tubb's "Walking the Floor Over You". On May 5, 1942, in his last session before joining the United States Army, he and Bonnie Blue Eyes recorded "Pins and Needles (In My Heart)" by Fred Rose, which charted for most of 1943, and went on to become a standard for the wartime era.

Post WWII 
After returning to performing in 1946, he charted hits, including "Why Don't You Haul Off and Love Me" and "I Must Have Been Wrong". Bob's younger brother Randy Atcher also appeared on some of his records. In 1948, Atcher signed on with WLS and became a performer on their National Barn Dance. He also released a long play (LP) entitled Early American Folk Songs in 1948, which was among the earliest LPs released by Columbia. In 1950, he signed with Capitol Records, and later in the 1950s moved to Kapp Records. In 1950, he recorded "Christmas Island" with the Dinning Sisters.  He continued with the Barn Dance well into the 1960s, and re-signed to Columbia that decade, re-recording many of his songs in stereo.

Atcher was the star of Junior Rodeo, a television program that debuted on ABC on November 15, 1952. Broadcast on alternate Saturday mornings from Chicago, the Western children's program had members of the audience participating in follow-the-leader activities.

Atcher, like Gene Autry, was a shrewd businessman, and bought several businesses and invested in banking, with the proceeds from his career. He was also the mayor of Schaumburg, Illinois from 1959 to 1975. He died on Halloween day in 1993.

Atcher Pool in Schaumburg is named after him. Shortly before he died, the Municipal Center in Schaumburg was named in his honor. The center was dedicated in March 1995.

Hillbilly-Folk Chart Hits

References

1914 births
1993 deaths
American country singer-songwriters
Country musicians from Kentucky
People from Hardin County, Kentucky
20th-century American singers
Singer-songwriters from Kentucky
Okeh Records artists
Columbia Records artists